Audiotistic Music Festival is a music festival that occurs annually in Northern California at the Shoreline Amphitheatre. Audiotistic is known for sporting a diverse assortment of genres, ranging from rap and hip hop to electronic genres drum & bass and dubstep. Previously, it was held in Southern California, USA, from 1997 to 2003 and from 2009 to 2011, in various venues such as the National Orange Show Events Center in San Bernardino, the L.A. Sports Arena, and the Long Beach Convention and Entertainment Center. However, on July 15, 2017 the festival returned but this time to the Bay Area with two main stages. The festival would continue to expanding by adding an additional day in 2018.

History

Audiotistic Music Festival began in 1997 from promoter Meelo Solis. He ran it with his brother Ben, and investment bankers Darin Feinstein and Bevan Cooney, with U.S. Concerts. It began as a mostly techno, strictly underground event. After failing to hold the event from 2004-2008, Solis teamed up with Insomniac CEO Pasquale Rotella to bring Audiotistic back to Southern California. The first Audiotistic Festival drew in 2,500 people. In 2001, the festival drew in 15,000; the next year it packed 35,000 into the National Orange Show Events Center. Despite the size of the crowd, police reported no incidents, and fans seemed remarkably controlled. By 2010, the festival was drawing in 25,000. The festival drew a smaller number in 2011 totaling 19,000 but was lauded as a success.

In 2002, in addition to its music lineup, Audiotistic tried to plug into Los Angeles skateboard culture by erecting a makeshift skate park inside the Orange Center's pavilion that was free to use for anyone willing to lug their board along. The park was designed by pro skater Chad Muska, whose company, Circa Footwear, also hosted a $5,000 best trick contest at the event.

On November 20th and 21st, 2021, the festival also took place for the first time in San Diego, CA at the North Island Credit Union Amphitheatre.

Controversies

Following the death of a 15-year-old girl at Insomniac's Electric Daisy Carnival in Los Angeles in 2010, Insomniac enacted a new 18 & over policy for all shows within the United States. Despite the increase in average age of attendees at the event, San Bernardino police still arrested more than two dozen partygoers. Twenty-one people were arrested on suspicion of felony drug and other offenses, and several more were arrested on suspicion of misdemeanor crimes, police said. Similarly, in 2011, 43 arrests were reported. Of those, 35 involved possession or sale of illegal narcotics, according to the police department.

On May 21, 2012, Rotella announced via Twitter that there would be no Audiotistic that summer, and that it would not come back until 2013.

Line-ups

2002
Audiotistic featured OutKast, Kanye West and the Roots. Along with leading alternative hip hop artists such as Oakland's Blackalicious and Black Star, and turntablists including QBert and DJ Swamp, Audiotistic also showcased techno and its numerous offshoots. Other acts included Mos Def, King Britt, Talib Kweli, house DJ Roy Davis Jr., trance DJ Dan. On the drum-and-bass stage, Craze, DJ Markie and MC Skibadee warmed up the crowd for Roni Size and Dynamite with a blend of fast-paced beats and Jamaican dance-hall vocals.

2003
Headliners featured Nas, Big Boi (of OutKast) and the Chemical Brothers. Other acts included Talib Kweli, King Britt, Sandra Collins, Blackalicious and Donald Glaude. DJ King Britt delivered a mix of down-tempo, jazzy grooves, while hip hop act Blackalicious also stood out for its blend of funk hip-hop and positive beats.

2009

2010

2011
Wolfgang Gartner filled in for Sebastian Ingrosso, who had to cancel his Audiotistic appearance at the last minute, due to him needing to receive minor surgery.

2017
Audiotistic came to the Bay Area for the first time on July 15, 2017 at the Shoreline Amphitheatre. It featured two main stages Frequency 1.1 and Frequency 2.2.

2018
Audiotistic returns to the Shoreline Amphitheater but this time with a two day event on July 14 & 15th.

See also
List of electronic music festivals

References

External links

 Official website
 Electric Daisy Carnival Official website
 Insomniac Events

Music festivals established in 1997
Rock festivals in the United States
Electronic music festivals in the United States
Music festivals in California